Geomitra grabhami is a species of air-breathing land snail, terrestrial pulmonate gastropod mollusks in the family Geomitridae.

Geomitra grabhami has been considered to be extinct, however live specimens have been found in 2008 and 2013.

Distribution 
This species is endemic to Deserta Grande Island, Madeira, Portugal.

References

Geomitra
Molluscs of Madeira
Gastropods described in 1878